Voy's Beach is a settlement located northwest of Corner Brook. It is part of the Town of Humber Arm South.

See also
List of communities in Newfoundland and Labrador

Populated coastal places in Canada
Populated places in Newfoundland and Labrador